Third officer may refer to:
Third officer (aviation), a rarely used rank in civil aviation companies
Third mate, a merchant marine rank
A rank in the Women's Royal Naval Service corresponding to sub-lieutenant in the Royal Navy
A rank in the Air Transport Auxiliary corresponding to pilot officer in the Royal Air Force
The third-highest rank in some pre-war British fire brigades